Aleksandr Davidovich may refer to:

 Alexander Davidovich (wrestler), Israeli Olympic wrestler
 Alyaksandr Davidovich (b. 1981), Belarusian footballer
 Aleksandr Davidovich (skier), Russian Paralympic skier who participated in Cross-country skiing at the 2014 Winter Paralympics